Hainley Charles Statia (born January 19, 1986 in Willemstad, Curaçao) is a Dutch former minor league baseball player and a minor league coach in the Milwaukee Brewers organization.

Career 
Statia was previously active in the Los Angeles Angels organization, playing for the Double-A Arkansas Travelers and the Triple-A Salt Lake Bees between 2008 and 2010. He was signed by the independent Lancaster Barnstormers after the 2010 season, but was transferred to the Milwaukee Brewers before the start of the 2011 season.

He was also a member of the Netherlands national baseball team at the 2007 European Baseball Championship, and 2014 European Baseball Championship.

On January 26, 2017, Statia was introduced as the hitting coach for the Wisconsin Timber Rattlers, the Class A Midwest League minor league affiliate of the Milwaukee Brewers. As of 2019, Statia is a roving instructor in the Brewers system.

References

External links

1986 births
2006 World Baseball Classic players
2009 World Baseball Classic players
2013 World Baseball Classic players
Arkansas Travelers players
Cedar Rapids Kernels players
Curaçao baseball players
Curaçao expatriate baseball players in the United States
Huntsville Stars players
Living people
Nashville Sounds players
Orem Owlz players
People from Willemstad
Rancho Cucamonga Quakes players
Salt Lake Bees players
Minor league baseball coaches